The Gunning Victoria Jubilee Prize Lectureship is a quadrennial award made by the Royal Society of Edinburgh to recognise original work done by scientists resident in or connected with Scotland.

The award was founded in 1887 by Dr Robert Halliday Gunning, a Scottish surgeon, entrepreneur and philanthropist who spent much of his life in Brazil.

Awards by a similar name have also been awarded by the University of Edinburgh.

Prizewinners
Source: Royal Society of Edinburgh

1887: Sir William Thomson, for a series of papers on Hydrokinetics
1887–1890: Peter Guthrie Tait, for work done on the Challenger Expedition
1890–1893: Alexander Buchan, for his contributions on meteorology
1893–1896: John Aitken, for his work on the formation and condensation of aqueous vapour
1896–1899: Rev. Thomas David Anderson, for his discoveries of new and variable stars
1900–1904: Sir James Dewar, for his researches on the liquefaction of gases
1904–1908: George Chrystal, for a series of papers on Seiches
1908–1912: John Norman Collie, for his contributions to organic and inorganic chemistry
1912–1916: Thomas Muir, for his memoirs on the theory and history of determinants
1916–1920: Charles Thomson Rees Wilson, for his studies in connection with condensation nuclei, ionisation of gases and atmospheric electricity
1920–1924: Sir Joseph John Thomson, for his discoveries in physics
1924–1928: E.T. Whittaker, for his contributions to mathematics
1928–1932: Sir James Walker, for contributions to physical and general chemistry
1932–1936: Charles Galton Darwin, for his contributions to mathematical physics
1936–1940: James Colquhoun Irvine, for contributions to organic chemistry
1940–1944: Herbert Westren Turnbull, for his contributions to mathematical science
1944–1948: Max Born, for contributions to theoretical physics
1948–1952: Alexander Craig Aitken, for his contributions to pure mathematics
1952–1956: Harry Melville,  for contributions to reaction kinetics and physics and chemistry of high polymers
1956–1960: Sir Edward Victor Appleton, contributions to ionospheric and radio physics
1960–1964: Sir Edmund Hirst, for contributions to the chemistry of carbohydrates
1964–1968: Sir William Vallance Douglas Hodge, for contributions to geometry
1968–1972: Philip Ivor Dee, for contributions to nuclear physics
1972–1976: Arthur Erdelyi, for contributions to mathematics especially the theory of special functions
1976–1980: Charles Kemball, for contributions to the study of analysis
1984: Nicholas Kemmer, for his contributions to the theory of elementary particles
1988: Sir Michael Atiyah, for his contribution to mathematics
1992: Peter Ludwig Pauson, for his contributions to the chemistry of diene- and triene-metal carbonyl complexes
1996: Kathryn A Whaler, for her contribution to the development of mathematical models on the long wave length component of the geomagnetic field
2000:  Angus Macintyre, for his contributions to logic, model theory, algebra, analysis and computer science2004: Peter George Bruce, for contributions to solid state chemistry2008: James Hough, for his work on gravitational waves''

See also 

 List of general science and technology awards 
 List of mathematics awards

References

British science and technology awards
Mathematics awards
Royal Society of Edinburgh
Scottish awards
1887 establishments in Scotland
Awards established in 1887